Al Urooba Club is a United Arab Emirates professional football club. It is based in the city of Mirbah and Qidfa, Fujairah. The club currently plays in the UAE First Division League.

History
In 1960 two clubs were founded in Mirbah and Qidfa, Al Wehda in Mirbah and Al Najma in Qidfa, both clubs were financially weak and by 1972, both clubs agreed to merge under the name Al Urooba to represent the Mirbah-Qidfa area of the Emirate of Fujairah.

Stadium
Currently the team plays at the 3000-capacity Al Sharqi Stadium.

Honours
 UAE Division One: 2
 1991–92, 2020–21

Current squad 

As of UAE Pro League:

Pro-League Record

Notes 2019–20 UAE football season was cancelled due to the COVID-19 pandemic in the United Arab Emirates.

Key
 Pos. = Position
 Tms. = Number of teams
 Lvl. = League

References

External links
 Soccerway
 

Urooba
Association football clubs established in 1972
1972 establishments in the United Arab Emirates